Rione XIII is an Italian restaurant in Seattle, in the U.S. state of Washington.

Description 
Rione XIIII is an Ethan Stowell restaurant in Seattle's Capitol Hill neighborhood. The menu has included pizza, fried artichokes, and pastas such as cacio e pepe and carbonara.

History 
During the COVID-19 pandemic, the pizzeria operated via carry-out and later used a street closure permit for outdoor seating.

Reception 
Seattle Metropolitan included Rione XIII in a 2021 list of "The Best Restaurants on Capitol Hill" and a 2022 list of "The Best Italian Food in Seattle". Gabe Guarente, Mark Van Streefkerk, and Jade Yamazaki Stewart included the business in Eater Seattle's 2022 list of "25 Essential Capitol Hill Restaurants".

See also 

 List of Italian restaurants

References

External links
 

Capitol Hill, Seattle
Italian restaurants in Seattle
Pizzerias in the United States